Wayne Long  (born April 13, 1963) is a Canadian politician who was elected to represent the riding of Saint John—Rothesay in the House of Commons of Canada for the Liberal party in the 2015 federal election.

Before politics
Long had a long career in business as a seafood executive, serving as a product manager for Stolt Sea Farm Inc., and later as President of Scotiaview Seafood Inc., a privately held company with a staff of two, according to Manta.ca. He subsequently became the President of the Saint John Sea Dogs for the 2005-2006 season, the city's CHL franchise. During his tenure, the team won the Memorial Cup in 2011, and Long himself was recognized with the John Horman Trophy for the league's top executive.

Political career
As the Liberal Party's nominee in Saint John—Rothesay, Long drew media attention for his outspoken support of the Energy East oil pipeline project. Long's position was far more forthright than that of the Liberal Party as a whole, which had promised to take a neutral stance. Long promised to aggressively lobby within the Liberal caucus to support the project.

In September 2017, Long made headlines for announcing his opposition to tax changes for private corporations proposed by Liberal Finance Minister Bill Morneau. On October 4, 2017, he was the only Liberal MP to vote for a Conservative Party opposition motion to extend the consultation period.

In February 2021, alongside Nathaniel Erskine-Smith, Long was one of only two Liberal MPs to vote in favour of an NDP-proposed motion to take a first step towards developing a national pharmacare system. The bill, proposed by Peter Julian, would have established the conditions for federal financial contributions to provincial drug insurance plans. The following year, the Liberal Party would commit to work towards a "universal national pharmacare program" as part of their confidence and supply agreement with the NDP following the 2021 federal election.

Electoral record

References

External links
 Official Website

1963 births
Living people
Ice hockey people from New Brunswick
Liberal Party of Canada MPs
Members of the House of Commons of Canada from New Brunswick
Sportspeople from Saint John, New Brunswick
21st-century Canadian politicians